Live at Wrigley Field is a live album by Dave Matthews Band recorded on September 18, 2010, at Wrigley Field in Chicago.  The album was recorded on the second night of a two night stint at the venue.  Most notably, this performance was the last on the band's 2010 Summer tour, and 2011 touring hiatus. It is also their final official live album to date. The album reached number 49 in the Billboard 200 chart.

Discs 1-4 were released as a part of the Live at Wrigley Field Double Play box set on May 31, 2011.

CD track listing 
Disc 1 (9/17/10):
"One Sweet World"
"Pantala Naga Pampa » Rapunzel"
"Funny the Way It Is"
"Lying in the Hands of God"
"Crush"
"Burning Down the House"
"Proudest Monkey »"
"Satellite"
"Shake Me Like a Monkey"
"Write a Song"

Disc 2 (9/17/10):
"Dancing Nancies"
"Why I Am"
"You & Me"
"Sister"
"Don't Drink the Water »"
"Everyday »"
"Ants Marching"
"The Needle and the Damage Done"
"All Along the Watchtower"

Disc 3 (9/18/10):
"You Might Die Trying"
"Stay Or Leave"
"Seven"
"Crash into Me"
"Good Good Time"
"#41
"Tripping Billies"
"Digging A Ditch"
"Squirm"
"Gravedigger
"Spaceman"
"Stay (Wasting Time)"

Disc 4 (9/18/10):
"Can't Stop"
"Grey Street"
"Jimi Thing"
"Time Bomb"
"Two Step"
"Christmas Song"
"Cornbread"
"The Last Stop"

Personnel
Dave Matthews Band
Dave Matthews - guitars, lead vocals
Boyd Tinsley - violins, backing vocals
Stefan Lessard - bass
Carter Beauford - drums, percussion, backing vocals
With Guests
Jeff Coffin - saxophones
Tim Reynolds - electric guitars
Rashawn Ross - trumpet, backing vocals

References 

Dave Matthews Band live albums
2011 live albums
RCA Records live albums